Dasht-e Zarrin Rural District is in the Central District of Kuhrang County, Chaharmahal and Bakhtiari province, Iran. At the census of 2006, its population was 7,147 in 1,290 households; there were 7,051 inhabitants in 1,591 households at the following census of 2011; and in the most recent census of 2016, the population of the rural district was 7,810 in 2,136 households. The largest of its 64 villages was Qaleh-ye Aliabad, with 929 people.

References 

Kuhrang County

Rural Districts of Chaharmahal and Bakhtiari Province

Populated places in Chaharmahal and Bakhtiari Province

Populated places in Kuhrang County